Onitkok Island is an island located inside western Coronation Gulf, south of Victoria Island, in the Kitikmeot Region, Nunavut, Canada. It is situated between the Couper Islands and the mainland. Other island groups in the vicinity include the Berens Islands, Deadman Islands, Leo Islands, Nichols Islands, and Sir Graham Moore Islands. Additionally, Blaze Island, Kigirktaryuk Island, and Seven Mile Island are nearby. The community of Kugkluktuk (formerly Coppermine) is located on the mainland,  to the southwest.

References

Islands of Coronation Gulf
Uninhabited islands of Kitikmeot Region